Brunei's healthcare system is managed by the 
Brunei Ministry of Health and funded by the General Treasury. It consists of around 15 health centers, ten clinics and 22 maternal facilities, considered to be of reasonable standard. There are also two private hospitals. Cardiovascular disease, cancer, and diabetes are the leading cause of death in the country, with life expectancy around 75 years, a vast improvement from 1961. Being a strict Muslim country, various topics surrounding sexual health and suicide are taboo.

Obesity 
At 7.5% of the population, Brunei has the highest obesity prevalence rate in ASEAN countries and one of the highest obesity rates in Asia. Studies conducted by the Ministry of Health (Brunei) found that around 30% of school-aged children in Brunei are overweight, and 20% are obese. Diabetes is the third-highest cause of death in Brunei after cancer and heart disease.

Non-communicable diseases 
Non-communicable diseases, such as cardiovascular diseases and diabetes, are the leading cause of death in the country. The overall life expectancy for Bruneians in 2018 was 75 years, which was a 20-year increase from 1961. As the population ages, non-communicable diseases are becoming more prevalent. Like many developed nations, Brunei has made a great effort to tackle NCDs by making preventative care accessible. In addition, they are raising awareness in their communities about the risks of smoking, sedentary lifestyles, and eating processed foods.

Mental health 
Being a culturally taboo subject, the rate of suicide has not been investigated.

Healthcare
There are four government hospitals in Brunei, one in each district. The largest is Raja Isteri Pengiran Anak Saleha Hospital (RIPAS) hospital, which had 1260 beds and has 257 doctors as of 2005 and is situated in the country's capital Bandar Seri Begawan. There are two private medical centers: Gleneagles JPMC Sdn Bhd. and Jerudong Park Medical Centre. As of 2011, the country had a ratio of 2.8 hospital beds per 1000 people. There are also 16 health centers and 10 health clinics, and a health center run by Brunei Shell Petroleum is located in Panaga. The Health Promotion Centre opened in November 2008 and serves to educate the public on the importance of having a healthy lifestyle.

Healthcare in Brunei is charged at B$1 per consultation for citizens and is free for anyone under 12 years old. The government covers the cost of sending citizens overseas to access treatments and facilities not available in the country. In 2011–2012, 327 patients were treated this way in Malaysia and Singapore at a cost of $12 million.

There are currently no medical schools in Brunei. Citizens wanting to study to become doctors must attend university overseas. However, the Institute of Medicines has been introduced at the Universiti Brunei Darussalam, and a new building has been built for the faculty. The construction of the building with research lab facilities was completed in 2009. There has been a School of Nursing since 1951. Fifty-eight nurse managers were appointed in RIPAS to improve service and provide better medical care. In December 2008, the nursing college merged with the Institute of Medicines at the University Brunei Darussalam to produce more nurses and midwives. It is now called the PAPRSB (Pengiran Anak Puteri Rashidah Sa'datul Bolkiah) Institute of Health Sciences.

The country has a low prevalence of HIV/AIDS, recording 0.1% prevalence in the population, and numerous AIDS awareness campaigns are currently being held.

See also 
 List of hospitals in Brunei

References